Moodu Manthiram is a 1989 Indian Tamil-language film directed by Manobala and produced by A. M. Ismail. The film stars Prabhu and Rekha. It was released on 1 July 1989.

Plot 

Dilip, a rich and arrogant man, gets into a conflict with the district collector, Kalpana. He successfully makes her believe in his love and marries her for revenge.

Cast 
 Prabhu as Dilip
 Rekha as Kalpana

Production 
Moodu Manthiram was directed by Manobala and produced by A. M. Ismail under Kaiser Creations. Shooting took place in Ooty.

Soundtrack 
The soundtrack was composed by Shankar–Ganesh, and released under the label Nahata.

Release and reception 
Moodu Manthiram was released on 1 July 1989, and failed commercially.

References

External links 
 

1980s Tamil-language films
1989 films
1989 thriller films
Films directed by Manobala
Films scored by Shankar–Ganesh
Films shot in Ooty
Indian thriller films